Baker Channel, also known as Calen Inlet, is a channel of Chile located in the Tortel, Aysén del General Carlos Ibáñez del Campo Region. The Baker River discharges into Martinez Inlet, the northern part of this large estuary. Merino Jarpa Island lies wholly within this great estuary, while at its mouth lies a group of smaller islands, called Baker Islands, which separate it from Messier Channel. Baker Channel also receives the waters of the O'Higgins/San Martín Lake through the Pascua River. The lake's far-reaching fjord-like arms extend approximately from lat. 49° 11' to 48° 22' S. Its north-west arm is that which drains into the mentioned river.

The calving front of Jorge Montt Glacier, which is the northern glacier of the Southern Patagonian Ice Field, reaches the Baker Channel. A number of icebergs can be seen in this area.

The channel marks the northern border of the Bernardo O'Higgins National Park, and is home to the Katalalixar National Reserve on Merino Jarpa Island.

See also
Caleta Tortel
Guayaneco Archipelago
Northern Patagonian Ice Field

References

Straits of Chile
Bodies of water of Aysén Region